The 2002 Fordham Rams football team was an American football team that represented Fordham University during the 2002 NCAA Division I-AA football season. Fordham tied for first in the Patriot League before losing in the second round of the national playoffs. 

In their fourth year under head coach Dave Clawson, the Rams compiled a 10–3 record. Rhamel Brown, Chris Rhodes and John San Marco were the team captains.

The Rams outscored opponents 407 to 201. Their 6–1 conference record earned the co-championship of the eight-team Patriot League. Fordham was selected, rather than co-champion Colgate, to receive the Patriot League's automatic berth in the national Division I-AA playoffs. 

Unranked at the start of the year, Fordham entered the national Division I-AA top 25 in mid-November, initially at No. 25 and rising to No. 12 by season's end. As a playoff team, the Rams played away games against higher-ranked teams in the first and second rounds. 

Fordham played its home games at Jack Coffey Field on the university's Rose Hill campus in The Bronx, in New York City.

Schedule

References

Fordham
Fordham Rams football seasons
Patriot League football champion seasons
Fordham Rams football